Suniel Shetty (born 11 August 1961) is an Indian actor, film producer, television presenter & entrepreneur known for his work in Bollywood, and has also appeared in several Malayalam, a few Telugu, Tamil, Marathi, Kannada,  and English language films.

Filmography

Films
As actor
 

Other language films

As producer

Web series

References

External links
 Films of Suniel Shetty on IMDb

Indian filmographies
Male actor filmographies